Clark is a male given name, translating to clerk. It is also often a surname (see Clark).

People
Clark Accord (1961–2011), Surinamese–Dutch author and makeup artist
Clark Adams (1969–2007), American freethought leader and activist
Clark Aldrich (born 1967), American author and maker of educational simulations
Clark Datchler (born 1964), English singer
Clark Duke (born 1985), American actor
Clark Gable (1901–1960), American film actor
Clark Gregg (born 1962), American actor, director, screenwriter, and voice actor
Clark Griffith (1869–1955), American Major League Baseball pitcher, manager and team owner
Clark Howard (born 1955), American popular consumer expert and talk radio host
Clark Johnson (born 1954), American actor and director
Clark Kellogg (born 1961) American basketball player, analyst, and broadcaster
Clark A. Murdock (born 1940s), senior adviser at Center for Strategic and International Studies (CSIS)
Clark Peterson (born 1966), American film producer and entertainment executive
Clark A. Peterson, American game designer and judge
Clark Olofsson (born 1947), a Swedish criminal 
Clark Schrontz, American football player
Clark Smith (disambiguation), various people
Clark Terry (1920–2015), American musician, composer, and educator
Liv Clark (born 2005), English performing arts gyal

In fiction
Clark Kent, secret identity of Superman
Clark Kent (Smallville), fictional character on the television series Smallville

Masculine given names
English masculine given names